The Alta Club is a private club in downtown Salt Lake City, Utah, named for a local mining district. It was founded in 1883, 13 years before Utah's accession as a state. The Alta Club serves as a forum for business development and social interaction, and offers facilities for dining, social events, business meetings, and health and wellness.

The Clubhouse is located at 100 East South Temple.

History
By the late 1800s the territory known as Utah had a burgeoning economy. As a result, several affluent groups formed out of the mining and smelting industry. One such group took it upon themselves to create a gentlemen's social club modeled after the prestigious Union Club of San Francisco. A proposal outlining the club's formation was mailed to prospective members.

Following recruitment the Alta Club was founded in 1883 by eighty-one charter members, thirteen years before Utah became a state. The club was organized as a social club "to present the comforts and luxuries of a home together with the attraction to its members of meeting each other in a pleasant and social way."

Foundation
Although it is widely believed that the founding members only allowed “Gentiles” or those who were not of the Mormon faith to join, that soon changed. Not long after the club's formation, their resistance to those of the Mormon faith shifted. The first Mormon member was William Jennings, a former mayor of Salt Lake City, joining in 1885.

The years of Prohibition brought new challenges to the club. Simon Bamberger, who joined the club in 1904, was one of the Eighteenth Amendment's strongest proponents. However, not everyone in the club shared his vision for a dry state. In the years since its repeal, rumors and stories surfaced telling of the various ways members got their hands on “hooch” and brought it into the club.

On March 3, 1883, 81 charter members formally signed the Alta Club Articles of Incorporation. An opening ceremony was held in Liberty Park. In addition to the 81 charter members, in attendance was Wilford Woodruff, a later president of the LDS Church, and Utah territorial Governor Eli H. Murray. The club took up its first residence in the Alta Block, located at 21 West 200 South. In 1892, the Alta Club moved to the top floor of the newly constructed Dooly Block at 109 West 200 South, which was designed by architect Louis Sullivan of Chicago (Adler and Sullivan).

New clubhouse

Founded in 1883, the club was originally located in the old Alta Block, midway between Main Street and West Temple on Second South. In 1892, the Club moved to occupy the two top floors of the newly built Dooley Building. The Club remained at this location until June 1898.

Construction of a new clubhouse began in 1897 and was completed in less than a year by builder George Cushing. On June 1, 1898, the new building formally opened. The site selected for the current clubhouse was purchased for $15,000 from Harriet Hooper Young, wife of Willard Young, who was the son of LDS President Brigham Young. The Alta Club building was designed by Frederick Albert Hale in Italian Renaissance style.

In 1910 the East wing was added, almost doubling the size of the original clubhouse. For reasons unknown the original stone could not be matched; old and new stone from a different quarry were mixed in the addition. At that time a new entrance was built on South Temple Street. A stairway was added to the older State Street entrance to provide direct access to the second floor. This became known as the ladies' entrance, as women were restricted to the upper floors.

In 1958 the Club acquired land located on the north side of South Temple Street for a parking lot. In 1993 the addition of a fitness center was completed with the goal of attracting new members.

In 2001 a $4 million renovation project was completed. A major area of renovation was the third floor, which had not been used since the 1950s due to a fire. The Alta Club's third floor now boasts twenty elegant guest rooms. The construction of a new parking lot on the south side of South Temple will be completed in 2014.

Ongoing renovations, along with caring membership and staff, maintain what has become one of Salt Lake's most beautiful and long-lasting buildings.

Great Depression
The Great Depression was a difficult time for everyone, including the “rich man’s club.” At one point in 1933, the financial situation became so desperate that the Board decided to entirely waive initiation fees for 90 days, in hopes of encouraging people to join and pay monthly dues. In 1936 the Directors authorized the purchase of two slot machines. This controversial idea helped restore the Club to fiscal health.

Present day
In 1987 the Alta Club welcomed its first non-widow women members. Deedee Corradini, then a Chamber of Commerce executive and later mayor of Salt Lake City; Genevieve Atwood, Utah State Geologist; and Annette P. Cumming, a prominent local philanthropist, became the first female members. In 2008, the Alta Club elected Ceri Jones as their first female president.

Activities
The Alta Club offers a formal dining room, meeting and social rooms, a bar, a grill, card room, billiards, a member library, 20 guest rooms, a salon, and fitness center.

Special annual events include: New Year's Reception, Sweethearts Dinner, St. Patricks Day Celebration, Mother's, Father's, and Easter Celebrations, Thanksgiving and Christmas Eve Dinner, and much more.

See also
List of American gentlemen's clubs

References

External links

1883 establishments in Utah Territory
Buildings and structures in Salt Lake City
Clubhouses in Utah
Clubs and societies in the United States
Gentlemen's clubs in the United States